Lady Chatterley's Stories is an erotic softcore TV show that aired on Showtime which ran for two seasons.

Premise
The show featured Shauna O'Brien as Lady Constance Chatterley, a land broker by day and at night a sexual psychiatrist to her friends and exclusive clients inside her secluded mansion. Constance is known for her taste for the sexually exotic and the ability to take an unflinching look into the sex lives of her and her clients and friends. Each episode treats the viewer to a provocative and arousing story punctuated by highly charged erotic sequences.

The series featured other notable softcore stars, including Kim Dawson, Holly Sampson, Veronica Hart, Susan Featherly, Tess Broussard, Shannan Leigh and Gabriella Hall.

The show's title is derived from Lady Chatterley's Lover, a classic and controversial romance-erotic novel by D.H. Lawrence, first published in 1928.

Production 
The show was the result of a long line of late-night cable TV erotic series such as Erotic Confessions, Women: Stories of Passion, and Beverly Hills Bordello that emerged in the middle-to-late 1990s which placed an emphasis on women-centered stories where the women were in control and could be sexually independent and become actual experts in the art and science of romance and seduction. These series also served as a virtual training ground and stable, continuous employment for many a B-actress in between their movie roles.

In early 2000, Showtime joined forces with Mainline Releasing Group (more popularly known 
as MRG Entertainment) to create a 15-episode erotic series to run on late-night weekends.(MRG had produced a similar series, Bedtime Stories, for rival cable channel Cinemax.) Polly Quennel was brought in as executive producer and Rebecca Lord was brought in as director. In an effort to create a totally different lead character than the usual professional sex expert in other series, they decided to utilize the famous lead character from D. H. Lawrence's classic novel, Lady Chatterley's Lover but with a more modern 21st Century, independent, sexually liberated woman.

For this series, however, Lady Chatterley would become a successful real estate broker by day, and a party girl/sex expert/faux counselor by night who would create innovative ways and means to solve her friends' sexual relationship problems....all while getting her field-playing time on her own.

When it came time to cast the pivotal role of Lady Chatterley, a conflict arose between the President of Showtime Networks and the series creators who were supported by some of the lower-level executives at Showtime. Many actresses tried out for the lead role with it coming down to two:
Chloe Nicholle, a middle-level hardcore adult actress better known as Chloe with limited experience and even less name recognition in the B-movie/cable TV market;
and Shauna O'Brien, January 1992 Penthouse Pet and a 10-year veteran of B-movies.

The Showtime president favored O'Brien because of her impressive qualifications and experience. She also fit into his philosophy of the erotic cable series. The series brass and lower execs 
favored Nicholle because they thought that she would be more suitable for the pushing of erotic boundaries that they wanted to accomplish. The second group — in direct violation of the president's orders, and while he was away on company business — pulled off a coup-d'état by giving Nicholle the lead role and began filming, production, and promotion of the series. They were able to complete production of the first two episodes; however, this ended when the Showtime president returned from his trip and found out about their actions. Production stopped, Nicholle was fired and O'Brien hired to take over the lead role, taking over the role beginning with the third episode.

Episode list
 "A Real Man"
 "Does He Have a Brother?"
 "Secrets"
 "Substance of Desire"
 "Fantasy"
 "Satisfaction"
 "The Manuscript"
 "The Wager"
 "One Night Stand"
 "Passion"
 "Switch"
 "The Husband"
 "A Few Moments in Time"
 "Before and After"
 "Mystery Lover"

References

External links
 

Showtime (TV network) original programming
2000 American television series debuts
2001 American television series endings
2000s American anthology television series
Erotic television series
English-language television shows
Television series by CBS Studios